Anna Willard (born March 31, 1984) is an American middle distance runner.

Personal
Willard grew up on a farm in Greenwood, Maine. She took up running as a high school student at Telstar High School in Bethel, Maine. She competed as an undergraduate for Brown University and as a graduate student for the University of Michigan. Because Willard missed a track season at Brown due to injury, she had not exhausted her athletic eligibility prior to graduation. Therefore, she was able to compete for Michigan in 2007 as a graduate student.

Anna became engaged to fellow American steeplechaser Jonathan Pierce at the 2008 U.S. Olympic trials and went by the name Anna Pierce during her marriage. She divorced Jonathan in 2014 and moved from London to Boston. She is especially known for dyeing her hair unusual colors. Her hair was blonde with pink streaks at the 2008 U.S. Olympic trials, and she dyed it purple before the 2008 Summer Olympics.

Career

Willard set the U.S. women's record for the 3000 meter steeplechase of 9:27.56 at the 2008 United States Olympic track and field trials on July 3, 2008, in Eugene, Oregon, en route to qualifying for the United States Olympic team.

Willard's U.S. steeplechase record was eclipsed by teammate Jennifer Barringer at the 2008 Summer Olympics. Willard qualified for the Olympic final by finishing sixth in her heat, and placed tenth in the final with a time of 9:25.63.

In 2009, Anna focused more on her 1500 m and 800 m racing. She was victorious at the USA Indoor 1500 m, and the 800 m at the Reebok Grand Prix and a Golden League meet in Paris. Anna chose to run only in the 1500 m at the World Championships in Berlin, finishing 6th with a time of 4:06.19.

2015
Event	Result	Venue	Date
1000m ind.	2:45.28	Boston (USA)	13.02.2015
1500m	4:26.61	Palo Alto (USA)	03.04.2015
Mile ind.	4:45.33	Boston (USA)	30.01.2015

2016
Event	Result	Venue	Date
800m	2:04.18	Waltham (USA)	04.06.2016

References

External links
 
 
 
 
 
 Anna Willard at NBC Olympics
 Anna Willard at GlobalAthletics.com
 Anna Willard Returns to Racing at RunnersWorld.com

1984 births
Living people
American female middle-distance runners
American female steeplechase runners
Athletes (track and field) at the 2008 Summer Olympics
Olympic track and field athletes of the United States
Brown Bears women's track and field athletes
Michigan Wolverines women's track and field athletes
People from Greenwood, Maine
Sportspeople from Portland, Maine
Track and field athletes from Maine
USA Outdoor Track and Field Championships winners
USA Indoor Track and Field Championships winners
IAAF World Athletics Final winners